Lété Island is an island in the Niger River, approx. 16 kilometres long and 4 kilometres wide, located around 40 kilometres from the town of Gaya, Niger. Together with other smaller islands in the Niger River, it was the main object of a territorial dispute between Niger and Benin, which began when the two entities were still under French rule. The island, as well as seasonally flooded land around it, is valuable to semi-nomadic Puel cattle herders as a dry season pasturage.

Niger and Benin almost went to war over their border in 1963 but finally chose to settle the dispute through peaceful means. In the early 1990s, a joint delimitation commission was tasked with solving the issue but could not reach an agreement. In 2001 the two parties chose to have the International Court of Justice rule conclusively on the matter. The Court ruled in Niger's favour in 2005..

References

Islands of Niger
Landforms of Benin
Territorial disputes of Niger
Territorial disputes of Benin
Disputed islands
Benin–Niger border
River islands of Africa
Niger River
Benin–Niger relations